The Singapore women's national sevens rugby union team is Singapore's national representative in Rugby sevens. They competed at the 2017 and 2018 Asia Rugby Women's Sevens Series.

History 
The history of women's rugby in Singapore has been a short one. The game was introduced by the Singapore Rugby Union through the men's clubs in 1996. The first Singapore women's national 7s team was formed in 1997 and they represented the republic at the Hong Kong International Women's 7s and the inaugural Asian Women's 7s in the same year.

Since then, the Singapore women's national 7s team has grown from strength to strength. One of their significant wins includes becoming plate winners in the Hong Kong International Women's 7s in 2003. Within Asia, the team achieved it highest ranking in 2004, when it became 2nd in Asia behind Kazakhstan in the Asian Rugby Football Union's Asian Women's Championship 7s held in Almaty. The team retained their top three placing the next year when the Asian Women's Championship 7s was hosted in Singapore.

As an indication of the growth of the game in the region, women's rugby was included for the first time in the South East Asian Games 2007 in Korat, Thailand and the Singapore Women's 7s team took the silver medal ahead of Cambodia and Laos.

Players

Recent Squad 
Squad at 2010 Asian Games:

Asian Games

References

Asian national women's rugby union teams
Women's national rugby sevens teams

W